Oba Diallo Carr (born May 11, 1972) is an American former professional boxer. A product of trainer Emanuel Steward's Kronk Gym in Detroit, he fought three times unsuccessfully for a welterweight world title.

Professional career
Among Carr's losses are three to then reigning welterweight champions Ike Quartey, Félix Trinidad and Oscar De La Hoya (by 11th round TKO on May 22, 1999 for the WBC Welterweight Championship).

Carr can no longer walk as a result of the blows he took to the head during his boxing career and uses a wheelchair.

References

External links
 

Living people
1972 births
American male boxers
Welterweight boxers
Boxers from Michigan